South West Wales Tourism Partnership (SWWTP) was the Regional Tourism Partnership (RTP) serving South West Wales. The Wales Tourist Board, now "Visit Wales", and part of the National Assembly for Wales initiated the formation of 4 RTPs across Wales to receive devolved resources and responsibilities for many aspects of tourism marketing and development. The partners in SWWTP are all the local authorities and a broad spread of tourism, hospitality, and leisure industry representatives from across the Region. SWWTP acts as the lead body supporting tourism in South West Wales.

Key elements within the Partnership's aims include: "…the need to maximise potential and eliminate wasteful competition for the ultimate benefit of the consumer and the trade" and "to encourage a greater integration of public and private sector resources by nurturing a distinct regional bias in decision making, reflective of the regional strategy / business plan". The SWWTP drives forward the SWW Regional Tourism Strategy, 'Open All Year'.

See also 
 Tourism Partnership North Wales

External links
 http://www.swwtp.co.uk/english/pages/e_framedoc.html

Tourism in Wales
Tourism in Pembrokeshire
Tourism organisations in the United Kingdom
Tourism agencies